Darrell L. Clarke (born September 17, 1952) is an American politician serving as president of the Philadelphia City Council since 2012. A member of the Democratic Party, he has represented the fifth district since 1999, which encompasses North Central Philadelphia, Strawberry Mansion, Lower Hunting Park, Ludlow, Yorktown, West Poplar, Fairhill, Brewerytown, Francisville, Spring Garden, Fairmount, Logan Square, and parts of Northwood, Fishtown, Northern Liberties and Center City.

Early life and education
A native of North Philadelphia, Clarke grew up in the Strawberry Mansion neighborhood. He graduated from Edison High School. He later attended the Community College of Philadelphia but did not graduate. He now resides in the Fishtown neighborhood.

Political career
He was elected as a committeeman himself and became an aide to John Street, who represented the Fifth District for nearly three decades and eventually became Council President.

Election to city council
In December 1998, Street resigned as a member of the City Council to run for mayor and endorsed Clarke for his seat in the 1999 special election held. Clarke won by only 140 votes over Julie Welker and Dorothy Carn. Welker filed a lawsuit alleging election fraud. The case was decided in Clarke's favor.

City council tenure
Clarke is a former Majority Whip and is the Chair of the Fiscal Stability and Public Property Committees and Vice Chairman of the Appropriations Committee. He was elected to the position of Council President after the office was vacated by the retiring Anna Verna.

One of Clarke's legislative actions was his introduction of the bill to end the City-subsidized lease on the 80-year-old headquarters building of the Cradle of Liberty Council of the Boy Scouts of America over their ban on gay scouts. After a protracted legal battle, the bill was overturned in Federal court and the City of Philadelphia was ordered to pay nearly a million dollars in legal fees to the Boy Scouts.

Controversy

In 2015, City Council President Darrell Clarke approved 1,330 private properties for the Philadelphia Housing Authoirty (PHA) to seize through eminent domain.

In 2019, the Inspector General stated that Philadelphia developer backed by Council President Darrell Clarke 'took advantage' of flawed city process for 'private gain'

Personal life
His father, Jerry, was involved in politics as a party committeeman. His mother, Ruth, was employed by the Veterans Administration.

Clarke has one daughter, Dr. Nicole Bright, and a grandson.

See also

List of members of Philadelphia City Council since 1952

References

External links

 Councilman Darrell L. Clarke - 5th District official city website

1940 births
Living people
Presidents of the Philadelphia City Council
Philadelphia City Council members
Pennsylvania Democrats
African-American people in Pennsylvania politics
21st-century African-American people
20th-century African-American people